Juxtastenopus spinulatus is a species of stenopodidean shrimp. It lives in the Red Sea, and across the Indian Ocean as far east as the Philippines. Originally described in the genus Engystenopus, it is now placed in the monotypic genus Juxtastenopus, in the family Stenopodidae.

Description
In life, the animals are red or pinkish, but with white tips to the chelae (claws) on the enlarged third pereiopods (walking legs).

Distribution
It also occurs in the Indian Ocean, and as far east as Hong Kong and the Philippines, but occurs in much shallower water than in the Red Sea.

Taxonomy
The earliest discovered specimens of J. spinulatus were assigned by Heinrich Balss to the species Stenopus spinosus. Its first description as a separate species was the type description by Lipke Holthuis in 1946, where it was given the name Engystenopus spinulatus. This was based on a single damaged holotype male, collected in the Lobetoli Strait, east of Flores, Indonesia, and the placement in the genus Engystenopus was considered questionable. The most distinctive characteristics of Engystenopus are characters of the third pereiopod, which was lacking from all the early specimens. When specimens with intact third pereiopods became available, Joseph Goy realised that "E. spinulatus" did not belong in the same genus as E. palmipes (the only other species of Engystenopus), and erected a new genus, Juxtastenopus, to hold it. The two genera are now placed in different families, although both names carry the meaning "close to Stenopus"; Engystenopus is one of seven extant genera in the family Spongicolidae, while Juxtastenopus is one of four extant genera in the family Stenopodidae.

References

External links

Stenopodidea
Monotypic arthropod genera